Sport Club Mangueira, commonly known as Mangueira, was a Brazilian football team from Rio de Janeiro. They competed several times in the Campeonato Carioca.

History
They were founded on July 29, 1906. Mangueira played 96 Campeonato Carioca games between 1909 and 1920. Mangueira suffered Brazilian football's largest goal margin on May 30, 1909, when they were defeated 24–0 by Botafogo. The game was played at Campo da Rua Voluntários da Pátria. Flamengo's first game ever was a Campeonato Carioca game played against Mangueira on May 3, 1912.  Flamengo won 16–2. The club folded in 1927.

References

Association football clubs established in 1906
Association football clubs disestablished in 1927
Defunct football clubs in Rio de Janeiro (state)
Football clubs in Rio de Janeiro (city)
1906 establishments in Brazil
1927 disestablishments in Brazil